Cecilie Myrseth  (born 27 July 1984) is a Norwegian psychologist and politician for the Labour Party.

She was born in Harstad and grew up in Lavangen, Troms.

Myrseth was elected member to the Storting for the period 2017–2021, and re-elected in 2021.

References

1984 births
Living people
Labour Party (Norway) politicians
Members of the Storting
People from Harstad
People from Lavangen
Women members of the Storting
21st-century Norwegian politicians
21st-century Norwegian women politicians